USS New Hampshire may refer to one of a number of United States Navy ships named in honor of the state of New Hampshire:

  was a  commissioned in 1908 and sold for scrapping in 1923
  was a  authorized in 1940 but cancelled in 1943 before her keel was laid
  is a  nuclear-powered attack submarine, commissioned in 2008 and currently in active service

United States Navy ship names